Vincenzo Gonzaga (1634 – 28 April 1714) was the reigning Duke of Guastalla and a member of the House of Gonzaga.

Early life 
Vincenzo was born as the second son of Andrea Gonzaga, Count of San Paolo (d. 1686) and his wife, Laura Crispano dei marchesi di Fusara. He was also grandson of Ferrante II Gonzaga, Duke of Guastalla.

Heir of the Duchy of Guastalla 
When Duke Ferrante III of Guastalla died in 1678 without a male heir, Guastalla was ruled by  Ferdinando Carlo, Duke of Mantua, who had married Princess Anna Isabella Gonzaga, Duke Ferrante III's  oldest daughter. Vincenzo became Duke of Guastalla in 1692.

Marriages and issue 
He was married firstly to Donna Porzia Guidi di Bagno (d. 1672), who was also his first cousin as daughter of Nicola Marquis of Bagno and Montebello by his aunt, Princess Teodora Gonzaga of Guastalla. After the death of his first wife, Vincenzo arranged to be married to another relative, Princess Maria Vittoria Gonzaga di Guastalla (1659–1707), the youngest daughter of his cousin, Duke Ferrante III Gonzaga of Guastalla (1618-1678) and Princess Margherita d'Este of Modena (1619-1692).

Vincenzo and Maria Vittoria had three children :

 Eleonora Luisa Gonzaga (1686–1742), married in 1709 Francesco Maria de' Medici
 Antonio Ferrante Gonzaga (1687–1729), next Duke of Guastalla from 1704, married 1) Margherita Cesarini, and 2) Princess Theodora von Hessen-Darmstadt
 Giuseppe Gonzaga (1690–1746), next Duke of Guastalla from 1729, married Princess Eleonore von Schleswig-Holstein-Sonderburg-Wiesenburg .

Vincenzo Gonzaga inherited in 1707 Bozzolo and Pomponesco, and in 1710 Sabbioneta.

Relatives 

His uncle was also called Vincenzo (1602–1694) and was Viceroy of Valencia in 1663, Viceroy of Catalonia between 1664 and 1667 and Viceroy of Sicily in 1678.
His cousin, Vespasiano-Vincenzo (1621–1687) was Viceroy of Valencia in 1669.

References

1634 births
1714 deaths
Vincenzo, Guastalla
Vincenzo
17th-century Italian nobility
18th-century Italian nobility
Knights of the Golden Fleece of Austria